Rodoald or Rodwald (died 694) was the Duke of Friuli following Landar in the late seventh century. The precise dates of his reign cannot be known.

In 694, Rodoald was attacked by Ansfrid and fled to Istria, whence he took ship at Ravenna to the court of Cunipert in Pavia.

Further reading
 Paul the Deacon. Historia Langobardorum. Translated by William Dudley Foulke. University of Pennsylvania: 1907.
 Hodgkin, Thomas. Italy and her Invaders. Clarendon Press: 1895.

Year of birth missing
694 deaths
7th-century Lombard people
7th-century rulers in Europe
Dukes of Friuli
Lombard warriors